Jack Gray (born 23 June 1998) is an Australian singer and songwriter. Gray gained recognition with the release of his first single in 2017 titled ‘Red Rental Car'.

Early life and education
Gray was born on 23 June 1998 in Mackay, North Queensland, Australia. After completing school, Gray moved to Brisbane to pursue a Bachelor of Music and honed his skills as a multi-instrumentalist, songwriter and producer.

Career
Gray started his career in 2017 with the release of his debut song ‘Red Rental Car’ which gained him mass recognition as an up-and-coming indie artist. Another one of his songs that gained mass acclaim was ‘My Hands’ that conceptualized the idea of sexual benefits outweighing unhealthy relationships. Jack Gray has also been featured on tour in the US, UK and Europe with Dean Lewis. 

In July 2022, Jack Gray toured Australia and New Zealand with Canadian pop sensation Tate McRae in Perth, Brisbane, Sydney, Melbourne, Adelaide, and Auckland, with all shows sold out.

Discography

References

Australian singer-songwriters
1998 births
Living people